Ellen Parker may refer to:

 Ellen Parker (actress) (born 1949), American actress
 Ellen Parker (politician), Canadian educator and NDP candidate

See also
Helen Parker (disambiguation)